Indonesia participated in the 1994 Asian Games held in the city of Hiroshima, Japan from 2 October to 16 October 1994. It ranked eleventh in medal count, with three gold medals, 12 silver medals, and 11 bronze medals in this edition of the Asiad.

Medal summary

Medal table

Medalists

References

Nations at the 1994 Asian Games
1994
Asian Games